The 2015 FIBA Asia Championship was the 28th and last edition of the FIBA Asia Championship in men's basketball in Asia. It was organised by FIBA Asia.

At the FIBA Asia Congress held in Doha, Qatar, the Central Board awarded the hosting rights to China. On 4 December 2014, the Chinese Basketball Association acquired approval from FIBA Asia to hold the men's championship at Changsha, Hunan, with the women's championship to be held at Wuhan, Hubei.

As the winner of the tournament, China qualified for the basketball tournament at the 2016 Summer Olympics, while the Philippines, Iran, and Japan would participate at the 2016 FIBA World Olympic Qualifying Tournament for Men, as stated by FIBA and the IOC in qualification quota.

The 2015 edition was the last FIBA Asia Championship, rebranded effective in 2017 as the FIBA Asia Cup and would include teams from FIBA Oceania.

Qualification

According to the FIBA Asia rules, the host nation China and 2014 FIBA Asia Cup champions Iran automatically qualified. East Asia, West Asia, Southeast Asia, and the Persian Gulf each had two berths while Central Asia and South Asia each had one slot allotted. The other four berths were allocated to the zones according to performance in the 2014 FIBA Asia Cup. Therefore, with Chinese Taipei, Philippines, Jordan, and Japan finishing in the top four in that tournament other than Iran and China which were both direct qualifiers, East Asia gained another two berths while the Southeast Asia and West Asia gained an additional slot each.

Venues

Changsha was chosen by the Chinese Basketball Association (CBA) as the venue city of the men's championship. Changsha Social Work College's gymnasium was chosen as the primary stadium, while Central South University of Forestry and Technology's gymnasium was the auxiliary stadium.

Draw
The draw was held at Changsha on 27 June 2015. Two teams that were unknown at the date of the draw, the South Asia qualifier and the last remaining team from East Asia were known a short time after.

The top four teams from 2013 were seeded; all other teams except the host team were drawn. By the time that there were three teams in each group, China chose their group, then the remaining three unseeded teams were drawn.

Included were the teams' FIBA World Rankings on the day the draw was made.

Squads

Each team had a roster of twelve players. A team may opt to allocate a roster spot to a naturalized player.

Tournament format
Preliminary round: The sixteen teams were grouped into four groups of four. Each team played all of the teams from its group once. The top three teams with the best record advanced to the second round.
Second round: The qualified teams from groups A and B formed Group E, while those from Groups C and D formed Group F. The results against the teams that had also qualified were carried over. The teams played the teams from the group they had not faced before. The top four teams from each group proceeded to the final round.
Classification round:
Teams eliminated in the preliminary round would be in a single elimination tournament with consolation games to play for 13th place.
Teams eliminated in the second round would figure in a single elimination tournament with consolation games to play for 9th place.
Final round: The remaining teams would figure in a single elimination tournament with consolation games. The champion would qualify to the 2016 Summer Olympics. The runner-up, third and fourth placer would qualify to the Final Olympic Qualifying Tournament.

Preliminary round
All times were local (UTC+8).

Group A

Group B

Group C

Group D

Second round

Group E

Group F

Classification round

Classification 13th–16th

13th–16th place semifinals

15th place game

13th place game

Classification 9th–12th

9th–12th place semifinals

Eleventh place game

Ninth place game

Final round

Bracket

Quarterfinals

5th–8th place semifinals

Semifinals

Seventh place game

Fifth place game

Third place game

Final

Final rankings

Awards

 Most Valuable Player:  Yi Jianlian
 All-Star Team:
 PG –  Jayson William
 SG –  Guo Ailun
 SF –  Samad Nikkhah Bahrami
 PF –  Yi Jianlian
 C  –  Zhou Qi

Statistical leaders

Player tournament averages

Points

Rebounds

Assists

Steals

Blocks

Other statistical leaders

Team tournament averages

Points

Rebounds

Assists

Steals

Blocks

Tournament game highs

Controversies

Rescheduling of Semifinals  
There was suspicion and outrage when the organizers decided to move the schedule of the semifinals game between Philippines and Japan from its original schedule of 9:30 p.m. to 10 p.m. Many fans believe that this move was a way for the Chinese to procure undue advantage come the gold medal match.

Finals Pregame 
A few hours before the championship match, Samahang Basketbol ng Pilipinas President Manuel V. Pangilinan accused the host country of pulling off shenanigans. He twittered that the delay of the tournament electric bus to bring the Philippine squad to the game venue as it was not charged would give them less time to warm up. He claimed the SBP were not allocated tickets by the Local Organizing Committee (LOC), so the Philippine squad coaching staff and SBP officials were without tickets hours prior to the game although it was standard practice. He also cited that the Chinese players stayed at a different hotel from the players from the other nations, which violates the FIBA rules.  It was also reported that when the Philippine squad finally arrived at the arena, the goal's net where they were shooting was suddenly removed for repair, which gave them even less time to warm up after the delay from the electric bus incident.

Officiating 
The officiating of the referees were also held in question by fans and various teams playing against China, especially the games with Jordan, South Korea, Iran and the Philippines.

Behavioural issues 
There was wide criticism of the rude behavior of the Chinese fans were shouting threats towards visiting teams, doing the dirty finger and throwing bottles and paper at the opposing team benches. There were incidents in which foreign fans in the venue were heckled and insulted by Chinese fans while the Chinese Police just stood by. One particular moment was when Calvin Abueva irritated Chinese supporters after he accidentally bumped Guo Ailun with his shoulder while returning to the bench following his fifth and final personal foul. There was a report that a Filipino cameraman got involved in a verbal exchange with a Chinese cameraman. Filipino veteran sportswriter Quinito Henson added that a Chinese photographer had to be restrained from scuffling with a Filipino lensman for shielding Abueva from crowd abuse.

Referees
The following referees were selected for the tournament.

  Duan Zhu
  Peng Ling
  Wen Keming
  Ye Nan 
  Yuen Chun Yip
  Harja Jaladri
  Atanu Banerjee
  Snehal Bendke
  Ceciline Vincent 
  Amirhossein Safarzadeh
  Naser Abu Rashed
  Yuji Hirahara
  Toru Katayose
  Arsen Andryushkin
  Yevgeniy Mikheyev
  Hwang In-tae
  Mohammad Al-Amiri
  Marwan Egho
  Rabah Noujaim
  Chan Owe Shiong
  Ricor Buaron
  Ferdinand Pascual
  Anan Daraghma
  Victor Mah
  Chen Ying-cheng
  Chung Yi-chih

References

External links

 
2015
2015–16 in Asian basketball
2015–16 in Chinese basketball
International basketball competitions hosted by China
September 2015 sports events in China
October 2015 sports events in China